The emergence of Saudi literature was a natural continuation of the Arabian Peninsula’s literary tradition. Soon after the establishment of the Saudi state in the early twentieth century, Saudi literature was born.

The Najdi poet Muhammad bin Abdullah bin Uthaymin, who brought about a renaissance in poetic style, was a prominent pioneer. During the same period, literary figures emerged in Al-Ahsa and Qatif in the eastern part of the Kingdom. The beginning of the Saudi era in the Hijaz (1925) was characterised by widespread production and circulation of texts due to the emergence of a modern literary movement, the availability of printing technology (the first printing press had opened in Makkah in 1883), and the influence of broader Arab literary movements on Saudi writers. These trends led to the 1925 AD publication of the first book in the history of the Kingdom, Mohammed bin Suroor Sabban’s Literature of the Hijaz. The following year, the Hijazi Library, the Kingdom of Saudi Arabia’s first publishing house, published another book by Mohammed Suroor Sabban titled The Exhibition (Al-Ma’rad). That same year (1926 AD), Muhammad Hassan Awwad published Avowed Thoughts (Khawatir Musarrahah), making him the first Saudi writer to produce an independent literary work. In this period, the dominant literary form was classical poetry. Poets wrote in a variety of genres and used prose as well as verse to examine social and political issues.

See also 
List of Saudi Arabian writers

References 
Saudi Arabian literature
Saudi Arabian writers